Kodanad View point is a tourist spot near Kotagiri town, Nilgiri District, Tamil Nadu state, South India.

Location
Due to the location it is also called the Terminus Country.

See also
 Catherine Falls

References

Tourist attractions in Nilgiris district